Winkel may refer to:

Places

Winkel, Haut-Rhin, France
Winkel, Oestrich-Winkel, Germany
Winkel, Rhineland-Palatinate, Germany
Winkel, Saxony-Anhalt, Germany
Winkel, North Holland, Netherlands
, Netherlands
Winkel, Switzerland
Winkel, Illinois, United States

Other uses
Winkel (surname), including a list of people with the name
Winkel tripel projection, a map projection

See also

Winkle (disambiguation)